Vesperopterylus (meaning "dusk wing") is a genus of anurognathid pterosaur from the Early Cretaceous Jiufotang Formation of China, the geologically youngest member of its group. Notably, Vesperopterylus appears to have a reversed first toe, which would have been suited for gripping; it was likely arboreal, climbing or clinging to tree branches with curved, sharp claws. It also has a relatively short tail, in contrast with its tailless (Jeholopterus) and long-tailed (Dendrorhynchoides) relatives. It was first described and named by Lü Junchang et al. While the original spelling of the name was Versperopterylus, this was a typo, and was emended by the authors in accordance with the International Code of Zoological Nomenclature.

Classification
In 2021, a phylogenetic analysis conducted by Xuefang Wei and colleagues recovered Vesperopterylus within the subfamily Anurognathinae, a subfamily within the family Anurognathidae. Within the subfamily, Vesperopterylus was recovered in a derived position, sister taxon to Anurognathus. Below is a cladogram representing their phylogenetic analysis:

References

Monofenestratans
Early Cretaceous pterosaurs of Asia
Fossil taxa described in 2017
Taxa named by Lü Junchang